This page details statistics of the European Cup, Euroleague and Champions League.

General performances

By club

By nation

Notes
Results until the Breakup of Yugoslavia in early 1990s. Clubs from present day Serbia won the title six times and were runners-up additional three times, clubs from present day Croatia won the title seventh and were runners-up once times.
Results until the Dissolution of the Soviet Union in 1991. Clubs from present day Russia won the title two times and were runners-up additional five times, clubs from present day Kazakhstan were runners-up once times.

By city

Clubs

By semi-final appearances (European Cup, Euroleague and LEN Champions League)

All-time table for semi-finalists and clubs with at least 10 participations
As of the end of 2021/22 season
Qualifications for the main tournament are NOT included, except in 'total participations' and 'qualifications' columns.
Total participations - includes unsuccessful participations in qualifications for the main tournament in addition to participations in the main tournament.

Wins/Defeats after penalty shootout counted as draws.
SF/F4 appearances in brackets denote finishes in the top 4 when group stage was played to determine the winner.  
Season 2019/20 is ONLY included in participations column, because teams didn't play equal amount of games in the group stage.

Euroleague and LEN Champions League Final4, Final6, Final8
The history of the LEN Champions League (Euroleague) Final Four system, which was permanently introduced in the 1996–97 season.

By season
Final4

Final6

Final8

Countries

 Only on three occasions has the final of the tournament involved two teams from the same country:
 1971 Yugoslavia: Partizan vs HAVK Mladost 4–4
 1993 Croatia: Jadran Split vs HAVK Mladost 13–12 (7–8, 6–4)
 1998 Italy: Posillipo vs Pescara 8–6
 The country providing the highest number of wins is Yugoslavia with 13 victories, shared by two teams, Partizan (6), HAVK Mladost (6) and Jug Dubrovnik (1)

Country representation in the main tournament
Qualifications not included.

Notes

References

External links 
 http://www.len.eu
 https://web.archive.org/web/20150513034438/http://www.len.eu/Disciplines/water-polo/clubs-pages/champions-league.aspx

+
LEN Champions League